Theodosis Kyprou (born 24 February 1992) is a Cypriot football forward who plays for Ermis Aradippou.

Career
He made his first appearance for Omonia against Paphos and he was in the starting line-up against Apollon Limassol for first time.

Honours
Omonia
Cypriot Championship: 2010
Cypriot Cup: 2011
Cyprus FA Shield: 2010

External links

UEFA profile

Living people
1992 births
Sportspeople from Nicosia
Greek Cypriot people
Cypriot footballers
Cypriot expatriate footballers
Cyprus under-21 international footballers
Association football forwards
AC Omonia players
Chalkanoras Idaliou players
Aris Limassol FC players
AEL Kalloni F.C. players
Ermis Aradippou FC players
Super League Greece players
Cypriot First Division players
Cypriot Second Division players
Cypriot expatriate sportspeople in Greece
Expatriate footballers in Greece